Chamber Hall Power Station was a coal-fired power station situated in Bury, Greater Manchester. It was opened in 1912 by the Bury Corporation Electricity Department.

Generating plant
When commissioned in 1912, the station had two John Musgrave & Sons steam turbines of the Zoelly impulse type, each driving a Siemens Brothers 2,000 kW alternator, generating a three-phase output of 6,000 V at 50 Hz. The station's three Woodeson boilers were supplied by Clarke Chapman & Co.

The station had its own railway siding connected to the adjacent Lancashire and Yorkshire Railway line.

References

Coal-fired power stations in England
Power stations in North West England
Demolished power stations in the United Kingdom